Mohamed Maghni (Arabic: محمد مغني , Tamazight ⵎⵓⵃⴰⵎⴻⴷ ⵎⵖⵏⵉ, born 1950 in Khenifra) is a Moroccan singer. Maghni sings traditional folk music from the Zayanes people. Instrument used is Loutar. and the language is Central Atlas Tamazight.

Discography

References

1950 births
Living people